Saint John the Baptist Catholic Church in Honolulu is a parish of the Roman Catholic Church of Hawaii in the United States.  It falls under the jurisdiction of the Diocese of Honolulu and its bishop.  It was named after John the Baptist, cousin of Jesus and is staffed by diocesan priests and the Dominican Sisters.

Located on Omilo Lane in the historic Kalihi district across the street from Fort Shafter, the church once served the Native Hawaiian, Portuguese and Spanish pineapple and sugarcane plantation laborers of the early 1900s.  A demographic shift occurred in the 1950s with the introduction of immigrants from the Philippines.  The congregation would eventually consist largely of several generations of Filipino Americans.  With the current influx of new immigrants from American Samoa, Marshall Islands, Samoa, Tonga and other Pacific Islands, the church has tailored its liturgies to accommodate new parishioners with masses in several other languages other than the English language.

See also
 St. John the Baptist Church (disambiguation)
 St. John the Baptist Cathedral (disambiguation)

External links
Saint John the Baptist Catholic School

John the Baptist Catholic Church in Honolulu, Saint